Sarah Shirley Feldman (born March 1, 1944) is an American developmental psychologist and Senior Research Scientist in Psychiatry and the Behavioral Sciences at Stanford University, where she is also associate director in the Program in Human Biology. She was the director of Stanford's Center for the Study of Families, Children, and Youth from 1991 until the center was shut down in 1994. She collaborated with Paul R. Ehrlich on the 1977 book The Race Bomb: Skin Color, Prejudice, and Intelligence.

Publications

References

External links
Faculty page

Living people
1944 births
American women psychologists
21st-century American psychologists
American developmental psychologists
Stanford University faculty
21st-century American women
20th-century American psychologists